The Gaißa is a river in Bavaria, southeastern Germany, which is a tributary of the Danube. It flows through the Bavarian Forest from North to South, crossing Aicha vorm Wald and joining the Danube northwest of Passau. Due to the nearby motorway, a good deal of dirt was flushed into the water from time to time.

See also
List of rivers of Bavaria

Rivers of Bavaria
Rivers of Germany